The Ayles Ice Shelf was one of six major ice shelves in Canada, all on the north coast of Ellesmere Island, Nunavut. The oldest ice in the ice shelf is believed to be over 3,000 years old.

The Ayles Ice Shelf, like the nearby Mount Ayles, was named for the Arctic explorer, Adam Ayles, who served under George Nares as the Petty Officer of HMS Alert in the British Arctic Expedition. Canada lost 94% of its overall ice shelf area between 1906 and 2015.

Ayles Ice Island 
On August 13, 2005, the entire shelf broke clear from the coast of Ellesmere, forming a new ice island. It is believed to be the largest shelf breakup of its kind in Canada in over 30 years. The event was registered on seismometers in northern Canada, and it was also verified via satellite imagery.

The breakup occurred over less than an hour. The event was noticed by the Canadian Ice Service at the time that it occurred, but it took a further 16 months to fully reconstruct the breakup sequence from past satellite images captured by Moderate Resolution Imaging Spectroradiometer (MODIS), to determine the climatic conditions during the event, and for the event to garner public attention. The event, which has been linked to global warming, is similar to the 2002 breakup of the Larsen B Ice Shelf in Antarctica.

The freed segment of the ice shelf, known as Ayles Ice Island, drifted southwesterly for two years, and in January 2007 accelerated into the open Arctic Ocean, causing concern for oil rig operators in the Beaufort Sea north of Prudhoe Bay, Alaska. In August 2007, however, the island became wedged into the Sverdrup Inlet of the Queen Elizabeth Islands. Although scientists initially thought it was likely to remain there for some time, possibly permanently, it soon afterwards broke into two parts and resumed movement.

There is concern that the ice islands may become a hazard for ships and oil platforms.

Other ice islands
While the formation of the Ayles Ice Island received widespread attention at the time due to the availability of satellite imagery and the ability of news media and scientists to visit the island, it was by no means unprecedented. Over the following three years, it travelled around  along the Beaufort Eddy, a slow-moving ocean current that flows eastward across the North Pole, then back west along the coast. In 1950, the U.S. Air Force 58th Reconnaissance Squadron was ordered to find T-1, and any other ice islands in the Arctic. In July 1950, T-2 was found, a roughly rectangular ice island estimated to be  by dimension. In 1947, a joint U.S.-Canadian expedition had noted and photographed a fresh water sea formation in the sea off Ellesmere Island. From a photographic examination of its ridges, T-2 was discovered to be the same ice island spotted off Ellesmere Island in 1947. Later in July 1950, the U.S. Air Force found Fletcher's Ice Island, or T-3, a kidney-shaped island, . This was later occupied for brief periods in the early and mid-1950s. In August 1951, T-1 was relocated, nestled along the coast of Ellesmere Island. It is not known how long prior T-1, T-2, and T-3 had been formed, but it is believed they had calved from ice shelves on northern Ellesmere Island. There are an estimated 80 ice islands in Canada's High Arctic, most of them part of the pack ice that covers the region.

Between August 1961 and April 1962, almost  of ice broke away from the Ward Hunt Ice Shelf. This event was attributed to tidal and seismic events.

References

External links 

 16-image slideshow of satellite and radar images showing the breakup (CBC News, requires Adobe Flash).
 Ayles Ice Shelf breakup images and media resources by Dr. Luke Copland, University of Ottawa
 Ayles Ice Shelf breakup background information by the Canadian Ice Service
 Arctic ice shelf collapse poses risk: expert, CBC news, Thursday, December 28, 2006, 6:39 PM ET
 Huge ice shelf breaks free in Canada's far north by Jeffrey Jones, Reuters, 29 December 2006 21:22:06 GMT
 Huge Arctic ice break discovered, BBC News, Friday, December 29, 2006, 22:52 GMT
 Giant Ice Shelf Breaks Off in Canadian Arctic by Richard A. Lovett, National Geographic News, December 29, 2006
 Ice-shelf collapse, climate change, and habitat loss in the Canadian high Arctic F. W. Vincent, J. A. E. Gibson & M. O. Jeffries. Polar Record 37 (201): 133-142 (2001).
 Science team lands on Ice Island, BBC News, Tuesday May 22, 2007

Ice shelves of Qikiqtaaluk Region